Quilapayún Chante Neruda is a compilation music album released by Quilapayún in exile in France in 1983 in commemoration of the 10th Anniversary of the death of the Chilean poet and Nobel laureate Pablo Neruda – who died in September 1973.

Background
Pablo Neruda was not a musician but he was a major inspiration to artist in the music field all over Latin America, especially for artists of the Nueva Cancion Chilena (New Chilean Song) movement. Neruda wrote the liner notes for a number of recordings released by young folk Chilean artists under the DICAP label. Many compositions were directly inspired by the poetry of Neruda and popular protest songs were often musical arrangements for his poetical text. Neruda's epic work Canto General, from which several poems featured in this recording were taken from, has been a major source of text for compositions by folk, contemporary and classical composers.

Content
This album included a compilation of songs from 1975 to 1983 recorded by Quilapayun and new arrangements of music inspired by the poetry of Neruda along with the participation of prominent French artists who sing and narrate Neruda’s poetry in French. There are songs based on Neruda’s early work Crepusculario (Twilight Book), from his Extravagario (Extravagary), on his political verse from Canción de Geste (Songs of Protest) and from his Cien Sonetos de Amor (100 Love Sonnets). There are also musical composition based on Neruda’s work “Fulgor y Muerte de Joaquin Murieta.”

The album opens with, Complainte de Pablo Neruda, a poetical elegy written by the French poet Louis Aragon to the music of Eduardo Carrasco which prefaces the rest of the compilation. Louis Aragon, who had been a personal friend of Neruda, died shortly before the release of this album. 	

The verses from Neruda's poems adapted to songs were translated from their original Spanish to French by Geneviève Dourthe, Jean Marcenac, Eduardo Carrasco Jr., Emmanuelle and Gérard Clery.

Liner notes

September 1983:10th Anniversary of the death of Pablo Neruda

Track listing
"Complainte de Pablo Neruda" (Complaint of Pablo Neruda) (3'48)Louis Aragon/Eduardo Carrasco (Arrangement: Eduardo Carrasco 1983. 
"El árbol [o El árbol de los libres]" (The Tree [or The Tree of the Free]) (3'44)Pablo Neruda/Rodolfo Parada (Arrangement: Quilapayún) 1979.Text: From Neruda’s ‘Canto IV, The liberators’ of Canto General)
"Pido Castigo" (I Demand Punishment) (3'23) Pablo Neruda/Rodolfo Parada(Arrangement: Quilapayún) 1975.  Text: Neruda’s ‘Canto IV, The liberators’ of Canto General)
”Playa del Sur” (Sea of the South)  (3’30) Pablo Neruda/Hugo Lagos (Arrangement: Hugo Lagos – Eduardo Carrasco) 1980.  Text: Playa del Sur, from Neruda’s work, Crepusculario (Crepusculary)
”Entre morir y no morir” (Between Dying and not Dying)  (4’15) Pablo Neruda/Sergio Ortega  (Orchestration and Conductor: Pierre Rabbath) 1980.  Text:  from Neruda’s Testamento de Otoño (Autumn Testament) from Extravagario.
"Premonición de la Muerte de Joaquín Murieta" (Premonition on the Death of Joaquín Murieta) (4’00)Pablo Neruda/Eduardo Carrasco (Arrangement: E. Carrasco) 1975.Text: Neruda’s “Fulgor y muerte de Joaquín Murieta”
”Un Son Para Cuba” (A Son for Cuba) (3’50)Pablo Neruda/Quilapayún (Arrangement: Quilapayún) 1976Text: Poem from Neruda’s work: “Cancio de Gesta”  (Songs of Protest)
”Continuará Nuestra Lucha”  (Our Struggle Shall Continue) (2’50)Pablo Neruda/Rodolfo Parada (Arrangement: Quilapayún) 1976Text: Neruda’s Canto V “Están Aquí” (They Are Here) from Canto General
”Monólogo de la Cabeza de Murieta" (The Monologue of Murieta’s Head) (4’50)Pablo Neruda/Eduardo Carrasco (Pierre Rabbath: Orchestration and Direction) 1980Text: Neruda’s “Fulgor y muerte de Joaquín Murieta”
”Dos Sonetos” (Two Sonnets) (4’55) Pablo Neruda/Eduardo Carrasco 1983Text: Neruda’s Sonnets: XCIX. Otros días vendrán, sera entendido (XCIX. Other days will come, the silence) and C. En medio de la tierra apartaré (C. In the center of the earth I will push aside) from Cien Sonetos de Amor (One Hundred Love Sonnets)

Personnel
Eduardo Carrasco
Carlos Quezada
Willy Oddó
Hernán Gómez
Rodolfo Parada
Hugo Lagos
Guillermo Garcia
Ricardo Venegas
Patricio Wang

Other artists
Catherine Ribero
Denis Manuel
Pierre Rabbath

External links
Quilapayun's Official Page (Spanish language)
Quilapayún Chante Neruda Lyrics
Neruda Biography at Nobel Foundation

Quilapayún albums
1983 compilation albums
Cultural depictions of Pablo Neruda